Oakzanita Peak is a mountain in the Cuyamaca Mountains of San Diego County roughly  from the Pacific Ocean, in Cuyamaca Rancho State Park east of San Diego and south-southwest of the town of Julian.

References

External links 
 

Mountains of San Diego County, California
Laguna Mountains
Mountains of Southern California